Maite Teresa Andreu Rodríguez (born 26 January 1971) is a Spanish handball player.

She was born in Almoradí, Spain. She competed at the 2004 Summer Olympics, where Spain finished 6th.

References

1971 births
Living people
People from Alicante
Spanish female handball players
Olympic handball players of Spain
Handball players at the 2004 Summer Olympics